Jack Thompson (born May 18, 1956), nicknamed "the Throwin' Samoan", is an American Samoan former professional American football quarterback. Thompson played in the National Football League (NFL) for six seasons, four with the Cincinnati Bengals and two with the Tampa Bay Buccaneers. He played college football at Washington State University.

His nickname was bestowed on him by Spokesman-Review columnist Harry Missildine during Thompson's breakout sophomore season at Washington State in 1976.

College career
As a collegian at Washington State University in Pullman, Thompson set numerous school, Pac-10 and NCAA records. In the second game of 1976, he took over on offense after senior starter John Hopkins was injured making a tackle in the second quarter at Minnesota. In a 2002 story, Thompson explained why he chose to attend Washington State and how his first series against Minnesota in 1976 was almost his last until offensive coordinator Bob Leahy convinced head coach Jackie Sherrill to leave Thompson in the game.

As a fifth-year senior in 1978, Thompson finished ninth in the voting for the Heisman Trophy, and concluded his college career as the most prolific passer in NCAA history with 7,818 passing yards. Thompson set Pac-10 records for attempts, completions, and TD passes. He was all-conference three times and either first-team, second-team, or honorable mention All-American three times. 

Thompson is one of only two players in school history to have his number retired (with Pro Football Hall of Famer Mel Hein); he wore No. 14 and graduated from Evergreen High School in White Center, Washington, in 1974, south of Seattle.

College statistics

NFL career
Thompson was the first quarterback selected in the 1979 NFL Draft, taken third overall by the Cincinnati Bengals, and played there for four years, which included the Super Bowl season in 1981.

Thompson went to the Tampa Bay Buccaneers in 1983 and was the starter, but was replaced the following year by Steve DeBerg.

In 2008, ESPN ranked Thompson no. 26 among the 50 worst NFL Draft busts.

NFL career statistics

Regular season

Playoffs

After football
After his football career, Thompson settled in Seattle and became a mortgage banker, as well as a volunteer quarterbacks coach at Ballard High School. His son Tony, a tight end, followed in his dad's footsteps in suiting up at Washington State, and a nephew, Tavita Pritchard, was a quarterback at Stanford University.

References

External links

Friends of Evergreen  − Jack Thompson

1956 births
Living people
American football quarterbacks
Cincinnati Bengals players
Tampa Bay Buccaneers players
Washington State Cougars football players
Players of American football from American Samoa
Players of American football from Seattle
American sportspeople of Samoan descent